The ARM Cortex-A72 is a central processing unit implementing the ARMv8-A 64-bit instruction set designed by ARM Holdings' Austin design centre. The Cortex-A72 is a 3-way decode out-of-order superscalar pipeline.  It is available as SIP core to licensees, and its design makes it suitable for integration with other SIP cores (e.g. GPU, display controller, DSP, image processor, etc.) into one die constituting a system on a chip (SoC). The Cortex-A72 was announced in 2015 to serve as the successor of the Cortex-A57, and was designed to use 20% less power or offer 90% greater performance.

Overview
 Pipelined processor with deeply out-of-order, speculative issue 3-way superscalar execution pipeline
 DSP and NEON SIMD extensions are mandatory per core
 VFPv4 Floating Point Unit onboard (per core)
 Hardware virtualization support
 Thumb-2 instruction set encoding reduces the size of 32-bit programs with little impact on performance.
 TrustZone security extensions
 Program Trace Macrocell and CoreSight Design Kit for unobtrusive tracing of instruction execution
 32 KiB data (2-way set-associative) + 48 KiB instruction (3-way set-associative) L1 cache per core
 Integrated low-latency level-2 (16-way set-associative) cache controller, 512 KB to 4 MB configurable size per cluster
 48-entry fully associative L1 instruction translation lookaside buffer (TLB) with native support for 4 KiB, 64 KiB, and 1 MB page sizes
 32-entry fully associative L1 data TLB with native support for 4 KiB, 64 KiB, and 1 MB page sizes
 4-way set-associative of 1024-entry unified L2 TLB per core, supports hit-under-miss
 Sophisticated branch prediction algorithm that significantly increases performance and reduces energy from misprediction and speculation
 Early IC tag –3-way L1 cache at direct-mapped power*
 Regionalized TLB and μBTB tagging
 Small-offset branch-target optimizations
 Suppression of superfluous branch predictor accesses

Chips
 Broadcom BCM2711 (used in Raspberry Pi 4)
 Qualcomm Snapdragon 650, 652, and 653
 NXP i.MX8, Layerscape LS1026A/LS1046A, LS2044A/LS2084A, LS2048A/LS2088A, LX2160A/LX2120A/LX2080A, LS1028A
 Texas Instruments Jacinto 7 family of automotive and industrial SoC processors.
 Rockchip RK3399

See also

 ARM Cortex-A57, predecessor
 ARM Cortex-A73, successor
 Comparison of ARMv8-A cores, ARMv8 family

References

External links
 
 ARM Cortex-A72 Technical Reference Manuals

ARM processors